Lodgepole is an unincorporated community in Perkins County, South Dakota, United States. Although not tracked by the Census Bureau, Lodgepole has been assigned the ZIP code of 57640.

The community took its name from Lodgepole Creek. It is surrounded on three sides by the Grand River National Grassland, although the tracts are not contiguous.

References

Unincorporated communities in Perkins County, South Dakota
Unincorporated communities in South Dakota